Francesca Piantadosi is a playwright from Portland, Oregon, publishing under the name Francesca Sanders.

In 2003, she was the recipient of the Oregon Literary Fellowship for Drama. In 2008-2009, she received a $1,013 professional development grant from Portland's Regional Arts & Culture Council.

In 2007/2008, Integrity Productions performed her play "8 Views Towards Center".

Her plays Celeste and Starla Save Todd and Win Back the Day and I Become A Guitar were performed at the Bartell Theatre in Madison, Wisconsin and the Kitchen Theatre in Ithaca, New York, respectively.

Works
 Lilac Samba
 Rising From The Sugar Bowl
 Urashima Taro
 8 Views Towards Center
 I Become A Guitar
 Ride The Rustling Wheat
 If You Take One Elf Off The Shelf
 Celeste and Starla Save Todd And Win Back The Day

References

American dramatists and playwrights
Living people
Year of birth missing (living people)
American women dramatists and playwrights
Writers from Portland, Oregon
21st-century American women